This page contains lists of reptiles found in the Sierra de Manantlán Biosphere Reserve, which straddles the states of Colima and Jalisco in Mexico. The reserve is located in the transition of the Nearctic and Neotropical realms and encompasses parts of the Sierra Madre del Sur, with a wide range of altitudes, climates and soils. The effects of tectonic and volcanic activities and erosion are notable within the reserve.

Forest types in the reserve including mesophytic, cloud, and dry deciduous and semi-deciduous tropical forests. Anthropologists know the region as Zona de Occidente, an area notably different from the rest of Mesoamerica. Some ceramic remnants, figurines and graves have been found, but there is little other material evidence of habitation. As of 1995 almost 8,000 people lived in the Reserva de la Biosfera Manantlan, engaged mainly in agriculture (corn, beans, tomatoes, sugar cane, watermelon, mangoes), livestock grazing, timber production, and extraction of wood for fuel and mining of coal or minerals. Another 30,000 lived in the surrounding communities and almost 700,000 in the surrounding region of influence.

Ecological characteristics

The Reserva de la Biosfera Manantlan is located to the extreme north of the inter-tropical zone. The climate in the region is influenced by various factors in addition to its latitude, such as its proximity to the coast, the effect of its landform – orographic shade – and the breadth of the altitudinal range, which partly goes to explain the high regional biodiversity and the presence of numerous plant formations ranging from tropical forests to those of temperate-cold climates.

The Reserva de la Biosfera Manantlan's varied and complex plant cover harbours a great wealth of flora. There are over 2900 species of vascular plants belonging to 981 genera. Wildlife is one of the important components of the high biodiversity in this reserve. Among the main values of the Reserva de la Biosfera Manantlan, in addition to its great wealth of species and its unique biogeographical characteristics, particular mention should be made of the presence of endangered or useful endemic species. So far 110 species of mammals have been reported, among which the Mexican vole Microtus mexicanus neveriae and the pocket gopher Cratogeomys gymnurus russelli, in addition to other mammals such as the oncilla, the jaguarandi, the ocelot, the puma, the bobcat, the jaguar and four species of nectarivorous bats.

Three hundred and thirty-six species of birds have been reported, among them 36 which are endemic to Mexico, such as the charismatic species: the crested guan (Penelope purpurascens), the military macaw (Ara militaris), the red-lored amazon (Amazona autumnalis) and the Mexican national symbol, the golden eagle. In terms of herpetofauna, 85 species have been recorded; of these it is known that 13 are endemic to the western and central region of Mexico: the rattlesnake, the black iguana, the frog Shyrrhopus modestus, the beaded lizard Heloderma horridum and the Autlan rattlesnake (Crotalus lannomi), an endemic species only reported for the area of Puerto de Los Mazos. Of the 16 species of fish identified, 13 are native and four are endemic to the region.

Names were collected by reserve staff and checked against local collections and resources such as Naturalista.

Testudines or turtles

Emydidae

Trachemys
 Trachemys scripta: pond slider,

Geoemydidae

Rhinoclemmys
 Rhinoclemmys pulcherrima: painted wood turtle, tortuga pinta

Kinosternidae

Kinosternon
 Kinosternon integrum: casquito de burro, pecho quebrada

Sauria or lizards

Anguidae

Barisia
 Barisia imbricata: falso escorpion

Elgaria
 Elgaria kingii: lagartija, lagarto de montaña, escorpion

Gerrhonotus
 Gerrhonotus liocephalus: culebra con patas

Corytophanidae

Basiliscus
 Basiliscus vittatus: basilisco rayado

Eublepharidae

Coleonyx
 Coleonyx elegans: cuija manchado, besucona

Phyllodactylidae or Gekkonidae

Phyllodactylus
 Phyllodactylus davisi: salamanquesa de Davis
 Phyllodactylus lanei: pata de res

Helodermatidae

Heloderma
 Heloderma horridum: salamanquesa de Davis, monstro de Gila, escorpion

Iguanidae

Ctenosaura
 Ctenosaura pectinata: iguana negra de roca

Iguana
 Iguana iguana: iguana verde

Phrynosomatidae

Phrynosoma
 Phrynosoma asio: lagarto espinosa, lagartijo

Sceloporus
 Sceloporus adleri: lagarto-escamosa de Boulenger, rono
 Sceloporus bulleri: lagarto-escamosa de Buller, rono collarejo
 Sceloporus grammicus: mesquite lizard, spiny graphic lizard, chintete de mezquite, rono, lagartijos
 Sceloporus heterolepis: lagarto-escamosa dorso carinado, rono
 Sceloporus horridus: rono espinosa
 Sceloporus melanorhinus: rono de arbol
 Sceloporus pyrocephalus: lagartija-espinosa de pedregal, rono
 Sceloporus scalaris: bunch grass lizard, lagartija de pastizal, cuija
 Sceloporus siniferus: lagartija-escamosa castano, cuija
 Sceloporus torquatus: rapido barrado, rono
 Sceloporus utiformis: rono de suelo, cuija

Urosaurus
 Urosaurus bicarinatus: tree or brush lizard,

Dactyloidae

Norops or Anolis
 Norops nebulosus: panuelo

Scincidae

Mabuya
 Mabuya brachypoda: lagartija de hojarasca

Eumeces or Plestiodon
 Eumeces brevirostris: alicante
 Eumeces colimensis: alicante
 Eumeces parvulus: alicante

Teiidae

Ameiva
 Ameiva undulata: whiptail, lagarto metalico

Cnemidophorus
 Cnemidophorus communis: whiptail, lagarto metalico
 Cnemidophorus costatus: whiptail, huico llanera
 Cnemidophorus deppii: whiptail, lagartija rayada de panzanegra
 Cnemidophorus lineatissimus: whiptail, cuije de muchas linea
 Cnemidophorus sackii: whiptail, campeche

Serpentes or snakes

Boidae

Boa
 Boa constrictor: boa constrictor, boa, ilmacoa, malcoa

Colubridae

Masticophis
 Masticophis mentovarius: whipsnake, chirionera

Conopsis
 Conopsis biserialis: two lined ground snake, here
 Conopsis nasus: grey snake

Drymarchon
 Drymarchon melanurus: black tailed snake, tilcuate, palancacoate

Drymobius
 Drymobius margaritiferus: corredora de petatillos, corredora moteada

Gyalopion
 Gyalopion canum: western hook nosed snake, nariz de gancho occidental, culebra de naricilla occidental

Lampropeltis
 Lampropeltis triangulum: false coral snake, falsa coralillo

Dryadophis or Mastigodryas
 Dryadophis melanolomus: salmon-bellied racer, culebra lagartijera

Oxybelis
 Oxybelis aeneus: culebra bejuquilla mexicana

Pituophis
 Pituophis deppei: culebra sorda mexicana, cincuate mexicana

Pseudoficimia
 Pseudoficimia frontalis: culebra ilamacoa

Rhinocheilus
 Rhinocheilus lecontei: culebra de nariz larga

Salvadora
 Salvadora mexicana: culebra nariz de parche mexicana

Coluber or Senticolis
 Coluber triaspis: green rat snake, culebra ratonera oliva

Sonora
 Sonora michoacanensis: Michoacán ground snake, culebra de tierra de Michoacán

Tantilla
 Tantilla bocourti: culebra encapuchada
 Tantilla calamarina: culebra ciempiés del litoral del Pacífico

Trimorphodon
 Trimorphodon biscutatus: culebra lira
 Trimorphodon tau: Mexican false nauyaca, falsa nauyaca mexicana

Crotalidae or Viperidae\Crotalinae: pit vipers

Agkistrodon
 Agkistrodon bilineatus: pichicuata, gamarilla

Crotalus: rattlesnakes, cascabel
 Crotalus basiliscus: Pacific rattlesnake, cascabel del Pacífico, vibora de cascabel, saye
 Crotalus lannomi: Autlan rattlesnake, cascabel de Autlán 
 Crotalus triseriatus: Transvolcanic rattlesnake, víbora de cascabel Transvolcánica, cascabel oscura de la Sierra Madre

Dipsadidae or Colubridae

Coniophanes
 Coniophanes lateritius: stripeless snake, culebra lisa

Dipsas
 Dipsas gaigeae: falso coralillo, zicatlinán, caracolera

Enulius
 Enulius flavitorques: culebra coluda del Pacífico,

Geophis
 Geophis bicolor: culebra minera del altiplano
 Geophis dugesii: minadora de Dugès
 Geophis nigrocinctus: minadora de la sierra de Coalcoman
 Geophis petersii: minadora de Peters

Hypsiglena
 Hypsiglena torquata: culebra nocturna

Imantodes
 Imantodes gemmistratus: culebra cordelilla centroamericana

Leptodeira
 Leptodeira annulata: culebra ojo de gato bandada, escombrera
 Leptodeira maculata: escombrera del suroeste mexicano
 Leptodeira splendida: escombrera ojo de gato

Pseudoleptodeira
 Pseudoleptodeira latifasciata: culebra de cabeza roja

Coniophanes
 Rhadinaea hesperia: culebra rayada occidental
 Rhadinaea laureata: hojarasquera corona
 Rhadinaea taeniata: hojarasquera rayada de conífera

Sibon
 Sibon annulifera: caracolera occidental
 Sibon nebulatus: culebra jaspeada
 Sibon philippi: caracolera de Philippi
 Sibon sartorii: caracolera terrestre

Elapidae: coral snakes

Micrurus
 Micrurus distans: western Mexican coral snake, serpiente coralillo del occidente mexicano
 Micrurus laticollaris: coralillo del Balsas
 Micrurus proximans: Nayarit coral snake, coralillo nayarita

Leptotyphlopidae

Leptotyphlops or Rena
 Leptotyphlops humilis: culebrilla ciega de occidente

Loxocemidae

Loxocemus or Rena
 Loxocemus bicolor

Natricidae or Colubridae

Storeria
 Storeria storerioides: culebra parda mexicana

Thamnophis
 Thamnophis cyrtopsis: culebra lineada de bosque
 Thamnophis eques: Mexican wandering water snake, culebra de agua nómada mexicana

Xenodontidae

Clelia
 Clelia scytalina: Mexican snake eater, culebra-viborera mexicana

Manolepis
 Manolepis putnami: culebra de cabeza-surcada

See also
Plants of the Sierra de Manantlán Biosphere Reserve
List of birds of the Sierra de Manantlán Biosphere Reserve

References

Reptiles of Mexico
Sierra de Manatlan
Reptiles of Sierra de Manantlan